The Cadillac CT4 is a sedan manufactured and marketed by Cadillac. It replaced the Cadillac ATS sedan and sits below the CT5 in Cadillac's lineup.  The CT4-V was unveiled first on May 30, 2019, followed by the standard CT4 four months later. Cadillac assembles the CT4 at the Lansing Grand River Assembly plant in Lansing, Michigan, as well as in SAIC-GM Jinqiao plant in China.

Overview
The CT4 went on sale in the second quarter of 2020. Following Cadillac's new "Y" trim strategy, the CT4 is offered in base "Luxury" trim, as well as Sport and Premium Luxury trims. The base engine is a 2.0-liter turbocharged four-cylinder, producing  and  torque. For 2023, GM China offers a new base engine in the CT4, a 1.5-liter turbocharged four-cylinder, producing  and  torque.

CT4-V

CT4-V Blackwing
It comes standard with a 6-speed Tremec manual transmission and is also available with an optional 10-speed automatic. The CT4-V Blackwing went on sale in early 2021 with a limited number of pre-orders.

Sales

See also
Cadillac CT5

References

Cars introduced in 2019
Compact executive cars
Cadillac vehicles
Sports sedans
Rear-wheel-drive vehicles
2020s cars